Juuso Forsström (born May 28, 1990) is a Finnish professional ice hockey forward playing for SaPKo of Mestis.

Forsström played for Blues at U16, U18 and U20 level but was unable to break into their main roster before his release in 2011. He signed for Kiekko-Laser of Mestis on May 18, 2011, but the team went bankrupt by December and he joined JYP-Akatemia for the remainder of the season. On April 26, 2012, Forsström moved to HC Keski-Uusimaa and remained for two seasons.

Forsström joined SaPKo on May 9, 2014 and won a league championship with the team in 2017. On May 8, 2017, he moved to Espoo United, playing for one season before rejoining SaPKo on March 23, 2018.

References

External links

1990 births
Living people
Finnish ice hockey forwards
Espoo United players
HC Keski-Uusimaa players
JYP-Akatemia players
Kiekko-Laser players
People from Lohja
SaPKo players
Sportspeople from Uusimaa